The Clerk of the Montana Supreme Court is a statewide elected office of the U.S. state of Montana. The clerk is elected every six years, and is responsible for receiving and validating appellate paperwork for the Montana Supreme Court, as well as being the custodian of records for Montana Supreme Court cases. The current clerk is Bowen Greenwood.

List

Notes

References

External links

Clerk of the Montana Supreme Court